Kinuthia is a surname of Kenyan origin that may refer to:

Ruth Kinuthia (born 1986), Kenya beauty pageant contestant
Ibrahim Kinuthia (born 1963), Kenyan long-distance runner
Kinuthia Murugu (died 2009), Kenyan politician
Kinuthia Mathukia Dennis (born 1988), Kenyan activist

Kenyan names